Bülent Erdem (born 21 November 1948) is a Turkish fencer. He competed in the individual foil event at the 1972 Summer Olympics.

References

External links
 

1948 births
Living people
Turkish male foil fencers
Olympic fencers of Turkey
Fencers at the 1972 Summer Olympics
20th-century Turkish people